Ostrowy may refer to the following places:
Ostrowy, Łódź Voivodeship (central Poland)
Ostrowy, Gmina Gozdowo in Masovian Voivodeship (east-central Poland)
Ostrowy, Gmina Zawidz in Masovian Voivodeship (east-central Poland)
Ostrowy, Wyszków County in Masovian Voivodeship (east-central Poland)
Ostrowy, Zwoleń County in Masovian Voivodeship (east-central Poland)
Ostrowy, Greater Poland Voivodeship (west-central Poland)
Ostrowy, Pomeranian Voivodeship (north Poland)
Ostrowy, Działdowo County in Warmian-Masurian Voivodeship (north Poland)
Ostrowy, Szczytno County in Warmian-Masurian Voivodeship (north Poland)